Events in the year 1767 in India.

Events
National income - ₹9,828 million
 1st Mysore War, 1767-69.

References

 
India
Years of the 18th century in India